Widegates is a village in south-east Cornwall, England, UK, about 4 miles north of Looe. It is on the A387 road about two miles west of Hessenford.

The centre of the village lacks any sort of local amenity but there is a nearby farm shop on its outskirts. Widegates has a population of approximately 500.

References

External links

Villages in Cornwall